The  is Japanese aerial lift line in Katashina, Gunma, operated by Nippon Paper Development. Opened in 1950, the line climbs Mount Nikkō-Shirane, the tallest mountain in Kantō region. The line is mostly inside . As such, it primary transports skiers, but it also opens in other seasons for tourists.

Basic data
Distance: 
Vertical interval:

See also
List of aerial lifts in Japan

External links
 Malnuma Kōgen Ski Resort official website

Gondola lifts in Japan
1933 establishments in Japan